Chiquinha Gonzaga is a 1999 Brazilian miniseries.

Written by Lauro César Muniz and Marcílio Moraes, based on the life of the teacher and composer Francisca Edwiges Neves Gonzaga, directed by Jayme Monjardim, Luiz Armando Queiroz and Marcelo Travesso.

Cast 
In order of the opening of the miniseries

First phase 
 In order of the opening of the miniseries

Special participations

Guest actor

Second phase 
 In order of the opening of the miniseries

Guest actors

Guest actresses

International Exhibition 

Chiquinha Gonzaga was sold to countries such as Chile, Ivory Coast, Ecuador, France, Honduras, Mauritius, Mali, Poland, Portugal, Dominican Republic, Russia, Venezuela and Vietnam.

References

External links 
 

Brazilian television miniseries
TV Globo telenovelas
1999 Brazilian television series debuts
1999 Brazilian television series endings
Biographical television series
Television series based on singers and musicians